Bouffordia is a genus of flowering plants belonging to the family Fabaceae.

Its native range is Oman to China (Southern Yunnan) and Malesia.

Species:

Bouffordia dichotoma

References

Fabaceae
Fabaceae genera